Carl Trujillo is an American politician who served as member of the New Mexico House of Representatives from 2013 to 2019.

Career 
Trujillo defeated Santa Fe Mayor David Coss in the Democratic primary for the seat. Coss had been endorsed by Trujillo's house predecessor, Ben Lujan.

Trujillo was defeated in the June 5, 2018 primary election by the eventual general election winner, Andrea Romero. Trujillo's term ended in January 2019.

References

External links
 
Legislative page

 https://www.santafenewmexican.com/elections/romero-overcomes-trujillo-in-race-marred-by-scandal/article_f0a92758-ced0-59e7-baaf-95af0089d726.html

Living people
Hispanic and Latino American state legislators in New Mexico
Democratic Party members of the New Mexico House of Representatives
21st-century American politicians
Year of birth missing (living people)